Mountain Road may refer to:

 A mountain trail
 A mountain pass
 The Mountain Road, a 1960 war film
 Mountain Road Lottery, a lottery by George Washington and others in 1767
 Mountain Road (Iceland), a type of road in Iceland

Places

 Mountain Road, Virginia
 Kohala Mountain Road, Hawaii
 Pedro Mountain Road, San Mateo County, California
 South Mountain Road, New City, New York
 Spring Mountain Road, Las Vegas Valley, Nevada